Edéia is a municipality in south-central Goiás state, Brazil.

Municipal Boundaries
Edéia is in the Vale do Rio dos Boisstatistical micro-region and has municipal boundaries with:
north:  Indiara
west:  Acreúna and Turvelândia
east:  Edealina
south:  Pontalina and Vicentinópolis

Highway connections with the state capital, Goiânia, are made by BR-060 / Guapó / Cezarina / Indiara / GO-320.

Political data
Eligible voters: 7,839 (12/2007)
Mayor: Elson Tavares de Freitas (January 2005)
Vice-mayor: Amilson Ferreira Borges
Councilmembers: 09

Demographic data
Population density: 7.01 inhabitants/km2 (2003)
Population growth rate 2000/2007: 0.05%
Population in 1980: 12,597
Population in 1991: 8,999     
Urban population in 2007: 8,511   
Rural population in 2007: 1,740

Economic data
Industrial units: 10 (06/2007)
Retail units: 117 (August/2007)
Banking institutions: Banco do Brasil S.A. - Banco Itaú S.A. (08/2007)
Automobiles: 1,092 in 2007
Cooperatives: Coop. Educacional de Edéia Ltda - CEDEL

Agriculture
Cattle: 79,439 head (2006)
Cotton 360 ha. /648 tons
Corn: 2,000 ha. /12,400 tons
Soybeans: 57,800 ha. / 150,280 tons
Number of farms: 472
Agricultural area: 108,948 ha.
Planted area: 45,400 ha. 
Area of natural pasture: 42,840 ha.
Workers in agriculture: 1,300

Education and health
Literacy rate: 86.5% (2000)
Infant mortality rate: 22.64 in 1,000 live births (2000)
Schools: 09 with 2,727 students (2006)
Higher education: Pólo Universitário da UEG 
Hospitals: 02 with 26 beds (2007)

History
Edéia began around 1915, in the settlement called Povoado de Santo Antônio do Alegrete, near the Turvo and Bois rivers, where a chapel to Saint Anthony was erected.  Later the name was changed to Alegrete and later in 1938 to Edéia, of unknown origin.  The first commercial house appeared in 1913 and the settlement got its municipal emancipation in 1948.  Electricity arrived only in 1966.

Ranking on the Municipal Human Development Index
MHDI:  0.759
State ranking:  58 (out of 242 municipalities in 2000)
National ranking:  1,624 (out of 5,507 municipalities in 2000)

For a complete list see Frigoletto

See also
 List of municipalities in Goiás
Microregions of Goiás

References

Frigoletto

Municipalities in Goiás